Paul Medley (born 21 September 1966) is an English former professional rugby league footballer who played in the 1980s and 1990s.

Career
Medley was selected for the 1988 Great Britain Lions tour. He played for Bradford Bulls from the interchange bench in their 1996 Challenge Cup Final defeat by St. Helens.
He played 385 games and scored 149 tries in a career that lasted 15 years. He was one of the key players of the Bradford Bulls for 10 years, he has since become the team's community development manager.

County Cup Final appearances
Paul Medley played as an interchange/substitute, i.e. number 14, (replacing  Mark Brooke-Cowden) and scored a try in Leeds' 33-12 victory over Castleford in the 1988 Yorkshire Cup Final during the 1988–89 season at Elland Road, Leeds on Sunday 16 October 1988, and played as an interchange/substitute, i.e. number 14, (replacing  Jon Hamer) in Bradford Northern's 20-14 victory over Featherstone Rovers in the 1989 Yorkshire Cup Final during the 1989–90 season at Headingley, Leeds on Sunday 5 November 1989.

John Player Special/Regal Trophy Final appearances
Paul Medley played right- in Leeds' 14-15 defeat by St. Helens in the 1987–88 John Player Special Trophy Final during the 1987–88 season at Central Park, Wigan on Saturday 9 January 1988, played left- in Bradford Northern's 2-12 defeat by Warrington in the 1990–91 Regal Trophy Final during the 1990–91 season at Headingley, Leeds on Saturday 12 January 1991, and played left- in 8-15 defeat by Wigan in the 1992–93 Regal Trophy Final during the 1992–93 season at Elland Road, Leeds on Saturday 23 January 1993.

References

External links
!Great Britain Statistics at englandrl.co.uk (statistics currently missing due to not having appeared for both Great Britain, and England)
(archived by web.archive.org) Bull Masters - Paul Medley
(archived by web.archive.org) Paul Medley Profile
(archived by web.archive.org) Pongia dismissed as Kiwis fall to Bradford

1966 births
Living people
Bradford Bulls players
Dewsbury Rams players
English rugby league players
Great Britain national rugby league team players
Halifax R.L.F.C. players
Leeds Rhinos players
Rugby league locks
Rugby league players from Leeds
Rugby league props
Rugby league second-rows